The 1962 Milwaukee Braves season was the tenth for the franchise in Milwaukee and 92nd overall.

The fifth-place Braves finished the season with an  record, 15½ games behind the National League champion  The home attendance at County Stadium  eighth in the ten-team National League. It was the Braves' first season under one million 

After this season in November, owner Lou Perini sold the franchise for $5.5 million to a Chicago group led by 34-year-old insurance executive  Perini retained a 10% interest in the club and sat on the board of directors for a number of years.

Ten years after the final television broadcasts in Boston, broadcasts of Braves games returned to a new channel, WTMJ-TV, giving Milwaukee television viewers a chance to watch the games at home.

Offseason 
 October 10, 1961: Merritt Ranew was drafted from the Braves by the Houston Colt .45s in the 1961 MLB expansion draft.
 November 8, 1961: Ellis Burton and Lou Jackson were acquired by the Braves from the Toronto Maple Leafs as part of a minor league working agreement.
 November 28, 1961: Frank Thomas was traded by the Braves with a player to be named later to the New York Mets for a player to be named later and cash. The deal was completed on May 21, 1962, when the Mets sent Gus Bell to the Braves and the Braves sent Rick Herrscher to the Mets.
 December 15, 1961: Joe Azcue, Ed Charles and Manny Jiménez were traded by the Braves to the Kansas City Athletics for Lou Klimchock and Bob Shaw.
 Prior to 1962 season: Hal Haydel was signed as an amateur free agent by the Braves.

Regular season

Season standings

Record vs. opponents

Roster

Player stats

Batting

Starters by position 
Note: Pos = Position; G = Games played; AB = At bats; H = Hits; Avg. = Batting average; HR = Home runs; RBI = Runs batted in

Other batters 
Note: G = Games played; AB = At bats; H = Hits; Avg. = Batting average; HR = Home runs; RBI = Runs batted in

Pitching

Starting pitchers 
Note: G = Games pitched; IP = Innings pitched; W = Wins; L = Losses; ERA = Earned run average; SO = Strikeouts

Other pitchers 
Note: G = Games pitched; IP = Innings pitched; W = Wins; L = Losses; ERA = Earned run average; SO = Strikeouts

Relief pitchers 
Note: G = Games pitched; W = Wins; L = Losses; SV = Saves; ERA = Earned run average; SO = Strikeouts

Farm system 

LEAGUE CHAMPIONS: Louisville

Notes

References 

1962 Milwaukee Braves season at Baseball Reference

Milwaukee Braves seasons
Milwaukee Braves season
1962 in sports in Wisconsin